In enzymology, an aldose-1-phosphate nucleotidyltransferase is an enzyme that catalyzes the chemical reaction

NDP + alpha-D-aldose 1-phosphate  phosphate + NDP-aldose

Thus, the two substrates of this enzyme are NDP and alpha-D-aldose 1-phosphate, whereas its two products are phosphate and NDP-aldose.

This enzyme belongs to the family of transferases, specifically those transferring phosphorus-containing nucleotide groups (nucleotidyltransferases).  The systematic name of this enzyme class is NDP:alpha-D-aldose-1-phosphate nucleotidyltransferase. Other names in common use include sugar-1-phosphate nucleotidyltransferase, NDPaldose phosphorylase, glucose 1-phosphate inosityltransferase, NDP sugar phosphorylase, nucleoside diphosphosugar phosphorylase, sugar phosphate nucleotidyltransferase, nucleoside diphosphate sugar:orthophosphate nucleotidyltransferase, sugar nucleotide phosphorylase, and NDP:aldose-1-phosphate nucleotidyltransferase.  This enzyme participates in nucleotide sugars metabolism.

References

 

EC 2.7.7
Enzymes of unknown structure